Tussocky Branch is a  long 2nd order tributary to Broad Creek in Sussex County, Delaware.

Variant names
According to the Geographic Names Information System, it has also been known historically as:
Mill Creek

Course
Tussocky Branch rises about 1 mile east of Susan Beach Corner, Delaware and then flows north into Broad Creek at Portsville.

Watershed
Tussocky Branch drains  of area, receives about 44.7 in/year of precipitation, has a topographic wetness index of 812.43 and is about 12% forested.

See also
List of Delaware rivers

References

Rivers of Delaware
Rivers of Sussex County, Delaware
Tributaries of the Nanticoke River